Clynchdale, also known as the Archibald Thompson House, is a historic farm property at 146 Beartown Road, in the rural Thompson Valley south of Tazewell in Tazewell County, Virginia.  The property is a small remnant of the estate of Archibald Thompson, one of the first to be established in the valley.  The brick main house has a long construction history beginning about 1830, and is one of the grandest representatives of Federal Greek Revival architecture.

The property was listed on the National Register of Historic Places in 2016.

See also
National Register of Historic Places listings in Tazewell County, Virginia

References

Houses on the National Register of Historic Places in Virginia
Farms on the National Register of Historic Places in Virginia
Historic districts on the National Register of Historic Places in Virginia
Houses completed in 1830
Houses in Tazewell County, Virginia
National Register of Historic Places in Tazewell County, Virginia